Roosevelt station is the current northern terminus of Line 1 of the Manila Light Rail Transit System and was constructed as part of the Line 1 North Extension Project. It opened on October 22, 2010. Roosevelt is one of the two Line 1 stations serving Quezon City, the other being Balintawak.

It is located at the boundary of Barangays Veterans Village and Ramon Magsaysay (Bago Bantay) in Quezon City, both of Projects 7 and 8, respectively. It links to Congressional Avenue and Fernando Poe Jr. Avenue. The station is named after the latter's name by the time of the station's operation, Roosevelt Avenue, which was named in honor of U.S. President Franklin D. Roosevelt.

The station was temporarily closed on September 5, 2020, to make way for the ongoing construction of the North Triangle Common Station. It was eventually reopened, 2 years later, on December 5, 2022.

Even with the renaming of Roosevelt Avenue to FPJ Avenue, the station will retain its name as Roosevelt Station.

History

Initial planning and construction
Roosevelt station was first planned for the second phase of the MRT Line 3. The station was planned to be located near the San Francisco del Monte River.

The second phase of the MRT-3 was shelved in favor of the Line 1 North Extension Project, a  extension of LRT-1 to the North Avenue station of MRT Line 3 as part of the MRT-LRT closing the loop project to integrate the operations of the Line 1 and Line 3. The station site was changed from the San Francisco del Monte River to the front of WalterMart North EDSA. However, the integration of MRT-3 and LRT-1 operations did not happen until the expected partial opening of the North Triangle Common Station in 2022. Construction of the North Extension started in July 2008 and was completed in 2010. Roosevelt station was opened on October 22, 2010.

Temporary closure
On August 7, 2020, it was announced that Roosevelt station would be temporarily closed from September 5. As part of the construction of the North Triangle Common Station, the tracks extending eastward from Roosevelt station have to be realigned in order to provide the necessary connection to the Common Station. Hence, during this temporary closure, Balintawak station would once again serve as the northern terminus of the line. Originally scheduled until December 8, 2020, the temporary closure was later extended until further notice.

On November 26, 2022, the Light Rail Manila Corporation announced the planned reopening of Roosevelt station on December 5, 2022, pending testing and system adaptation to the new signaling system; LRMC followed up and confirmed that the reopening will proceed as scheduled.

Transportation links
There are several buses, jeepneys, and UV Express plying EDSA, as well as Congressional Avenue and Roosevelt Avenue. The station serves as an interchange with the EDSA Carousel, which is accessible via the emergency exits of the station.

Nearby landmarks
The station is close to various shopping places and malls, particularly WalterMart North EDSA, Jackman Plaza Muñoz, Muñoz Market and S&R Membership Shopping - Congressional.

Gallery

See also
List of rail transit stations in Metro Manila
Manila Light Rail Transit System

References

Manila Light Rail Transit System stations
Railway stations opened in 2010
Buildings and structures in Quezon City